Manic-5 Aerodrome  is a registered aerodrome located  west northwest of the Daniel-Johnson Dam (Manic-5), Quebec, Canada. The aerodrome is only used during forest fires.

See also
Manic 5/Lac Louise Water Aerodrome
Manicouagan Reservoir hydroelectric projects, also known as Manic-1 through Manic-5

References

Registered aerodromes in Côte-Nord